Crocus dalmaticus  is a species of flowering plant in the genus Crocus of the family Iridaceae. It is a cormous perennial native range is from the north western Balkan Peninsula to northwestern Albania.

Crocus dalmaticus is a herbaceous perennial geophyte growing from a corm. It has dark green narrow leaves, the flower is slender and the tepals have pointed ends. Flower colors range from pink-lilac to buff to dark violet, the throat is yellow. The orange stigama is three parted. Flowering occurs in February. Hardy to USDA zone 7.

References

dalmaticus
Flora of Albania
Plants described in 1842